James A. Tipton is an American politician from Kentucky. He is a Republican and represents District 53 in the State House.

Political career 
In May 2022, he was appointed co-chair of the Kentucky General Assembly's Public Pension Oversight Board.

References

External links

Living people
Republican Party members of the Kentucky House of Representatives
21st-century American politicians
Year of birth missing (living people)
People from Spencer County, Kentucky
University of Kentucky alumni